Bernard Lewis (1916–2018) is a British-American historian.

Bernard Lewis may also refer to:
Bernard Lewis (entrepreneur) (born 1926), founder of the River Island retail chain
Bernard Lewis (critic) (1870–1956), South African art critic
Bernie Lewis (born 1945), Welsh footballer
Bernard Lewis (scientist) (1899–1993), English engineer
Bernard Lewis (rugby league) (born 1997), rugby player